Arminto is an unincorporated community in northwestern Natrona County, Wyoming, United States.  It lies along local roads west of the city of Casper, the county seat of Natrona County.  Its elevation is 6,053 feet (1,845 m).

History
Arminto was built as a stop on the Chicago, Burlington and Quincy Railroad, and was named for Manuel Armenta who started the nearby Jack Pot Ranch.Wyoming Place Names, p. 160, Annals of Wyoming (1942)  Arminto voted to incorporate in 1915; unincorporated towns could not sell liquor in Wyoming at the time.(9 March 1915). Incorporate to Get Saloons, Cheyenne State Leader

Although Arminto is now unincorporated, it had a post office, that closed in 1964.  

The Big Horn Hotel was moved from Wolton to Arminto in 1913 when the railroad arrived there.  It was entered on the National Register of Historic Places in 1978, and was destroyed by a fire in 1985.

Climate
According to the Köppen Climate Classification system, Arminto has a semi-arid climate, abbreviated "BSk" on climate maps.

References

Unincorporated communities in Natrona County, Wyoming
Unincorporated communities in Wyoming